The London Underground Q Stock were trains used on the District line of the London Underground. First introduced in 1938, these electric multiple units were formed from cars built between 1923 and 1935 and new purpose-built cars, and fitted with electro-pneumatic brakes and guard controlled air-operated doors. Trains were made up from cars of different ages with differing appearances, the older ones with clerestory roofs and the newer ones with flared sides. Some units were withdrawn in the early 1960s, although six- and eight-car trains remained on the District line with use gradually diminishing to peak hours only, and four car units worked the East London line until 1971.

History

When the London Passenger Transport Board took over from the District Railway in 1933, 173 motor cars were less than fifteen years old although most of the trailer cars were of the original 'B Stock' wooden type built in 1904–05. As part of the 1935–40 New Works Programme, the replacement of these trailer cars and upgrading the fleet with electro-pneumatic brakes and guard controlled air-operated doors was the priority.

The modern motor cars were converted and reclassified 'Q Stock', followed by their two-digit year. 183 trailer cars and 25 new motors were purchased; these became Q38 Stock. The first Q Stock train entered service in November 1938.

Formations

Trains would be of mixed formation with shorter ones running off-peak, although sources differ as to the formations. Some detail eight-car formations of two three-car and one two-car units, whilst six-car trains ran off-peak without the two-car pair, whereas many off-peak trains were four cars in length. In later years trains were reformed into six-car formations, made up of one four-car and one two-car unit, the two-car unit being at the eastern end. Another two-car unit was sometimes added during busy times.

Withdrawal
After World War II the first phase of R Stock took 82 of the Q38 Stock trailers and replaced these with Q31 and Q35 trailers from the 'H Stock'; some motor cars were converted to trailers. Further conversions of the Q38 into the R Stock and O/P Stock followed, 6 and 8 car sets being maintained by converting some of the older motor cars into trailers. The transfer of COP Stock from the Metropolitan line after being replaced by the A Stock in the early 1960s and the introduction of the C Stock on the Hammersmith & City and Circle lines in the early 1970s allowed most of the Q stock to be scrapped. The remaining 28 Q38 Stock cars were included in 4-car units mixed with earlier types that worked the East London line until 1971, although Q38 Stock carriages that had been converted to R Stock ran until 1983.   The trains transferred to the East London line had their two-car units removed and placed in store.

References

Notes

Sources

External links

Q
Train-related introductions in 1938